The Heath–Jarrow–Morton (HJM) framework is a general framework to model the evolution of interest rate curves – instantaneous forward rate curves in particular (as opposed to simple forward rates). When the volatility and drift of the instantaneous forward rate are assumed to be deterministic, this is known as the Gaussian Heath–Jarrow–Morton (HJM) model of forward rates. For direct modeling of simple forward rates the Brace–Gatarek–Musiela model represents an example.

The HJM framework originates from the work of David Heath, Robert A. Jarrow, and Andrew Morton in the late 1980s, especially Bond pricing and the term structure of interest rates: a new methodology (1987) – working paper, Cornell University, and Bond pricing and the term structure of interest rates: a new methodology (1989) – working paper (revised ed.), Cornell University. It has its critics, however, with Paul Wilmott describing it as "...actually just a big rug for [mistakes] to be swept under".

Framework
The key to these techniques is the recognition that the drifts of the no-arbitrage evolution of certain variables can be expressed as functions of their volatilities and the correlations among themselves. In other words, no drift estimation is needed.

Models developed according to the HJM framework are different from the so-called short-rate models in the sense that HJM-type models capture the full dynamics of the entire forward rate curve, while the short-rate models only capture the dynamics of a point on the curve (the short rate).

However, models developed according to the general HJM framework are often non-Markovian and can even have infinite dimensions. A number of researchers have made great contributions to tackle this problem. They show that if the volatility structure of the forward rates satisfy certain conditions, then an HJM model can be expressed entirely by a finite state Markovian system, making it computationally feasible. Examples include a one-factor, two state model (O. Cheyette, "Term Structure Dynamics and Mortgage Valuation", Journal of Fixed Income, 1, 1992; P. Ritchken and L. Sankarasubramanian in "Volatility Structures of Forward Rates and the Dynamics of Term Structure", Mathematical Finance, 5, No. 1, Jan 1995), and later multi-factor versions.

Mathematical formulation

The class of models developed by Heath, Jarrow and Morton (1992) is based on modelling the forward rates.

The relation between bond prices and the forward rate is also provided in the following way:

Here  is the price at time  of a zero-coupon bond paying $1 at maturity . The risk-free money market account is also defined as

This last equation lets us define , the risk free short rate. The HJM framework assumes that the dynamics of  under a risk-neutral pricing measure  are the following:

Let's define the following process:

The dynamics of  can be obtained through Leibniz's rule:

But  must be a martingale under the pricing measure , so we require that . Differentiating this with respect to  we get:

Which finally tells us that the dynamics of  must be of the following form:

See also
Black–Derman–Toy model
Brace–Gatarek–Musiela model
Chen model
Cheyette model
Ho–Lee model
Hull–White model

References

Notes

Sources
 Heath, D., Jarrow, R. and Morton, A. (1990). Bond Pricing and the Term Structure of Interest Rates: A Discrete Time Approximation. Journal of Financial and Quantitative Analysis, 25:419-440.
 Heath, D., Jarrow, R. and Morton, A. (1991). Contingent Claims Valuation with a Random Evolution of Interest Rates . Review of Futures Markets, 9:54-76.
 Heath, D., Jarrow, R. and Morton, A. (1992). Bond Pricing and the Term Structure of Interest Rates: A New Methodology for Contingent Claims Valuation. Econometrica, 60(1):77-105. 
 Robert Jarrow (2002). Modelling Fixed Income Securities and Interest Rate Options (2nd ed.). Stanford Economics and Finance.

Further reading
Non-Bushy Trees For Gaussian HJM And Lognormal Forward Models, Prof Alan Brace, University of Technology Sydney
 The Heath-Jarrow-Morton Term Structure Model , Prof. Don Chance E. J. Ourso College of Business, Louisiana State University
Recombining Trees for One-Dimensional Forward Rate Models, Dariusz Gatarek, Wyższa Szkoła Biznesu – National-Louis University, and Jaroslaw Kolakowski
Implementing No-Arbitrage Term Structure of Interest Rate Models in Discrete Time When Interest Rates Are Normally Distributed, Dwight M Grant and Gautam Vora. The Journal of Fixed Income March 1999, Vol. 8, No. 4: pp. 85–98
 Heath–Jarrow–Morton model and its application, Vladimir I Pozdynyakov, University of Pennsylvania
 An Empirical Study of the Convergence Properties of the Non-recombining HJM Forward Rate Tree in Pricing Interest Rate Derivatives, A.R. Radhakrishnan New York University
 Modeling Interest Rates with Heath, Jarrow and Morton. Dr Donald van Deventer, Kamakura Corporation:
With One Factor and Maturity-Dependent Volatility 
With One Factor and Rate and Maturity-Dependent Volatility 
With Two Factors and Rate and Maturity-Dependent Volatility 
With Three Factors and Rate and Maturity-Dependent Volatility 

 
Financial models
Mathematical finance
Fixed income analysis